Guillaume Charlier (1854–1925) was a Belgian sculptor, most of whose works are now kept in the Charlier Museum in Saint-Josse-ten-Noode.

Life 

Charlier was born in Ixelles, the eldest son of a large family. He was 15 years old in 1870 when his father died and he was obliged to become the family's breadwinner. In 1880, Henri Van Cutsem, an art collector and patron of artists, bought his first works. Charlier spent some months in Italy where he came into contact with ancient art. He was also interested in the ordinary man in the street. He was also a portraitist.
He was a member of the Société Nationale des Beaux-Arts and became a member of the Groupe des XX in 1885, when the sculptor Jef Lambeaux resigned from it.

In 1904 Henri Van Cutsem, his patron, died and bequeathed him the house in the Avenue des Arts in Saint-Josse-ten-Noode where he had been living and working. When Charlier himself died in 1925 his will left the house to the Commune of Saint-Josse-ten-Noode on condition that it should be opened to the public as a museum, as it was in 1928. 

Charlier is buried in the Cemetery of Saint-Josse-ten-Noode.

His works are now in Brussels in the Charlier Museum, in Tournai in the collections of Henry Van Cutsem now held by the Musée des Beaux-Arts de Tournai and in Blankenberge.

External links 
 Charlier Museum official website: Guillaume Charlier

Further reading
 Fontier, J., 1994:Blankenberge, het kunstpatrimonium, pp. 50–53. Blankenberge
 De Keyser, E., 1990: De 19de eeuwse Belgische beeldhouwkunst, pp. 321–325. Brussels
 Ketels, Elia, 1979: "Guillaume Charlier" in the Biographie Nationale, part 41, col. 110–114. Brussels
 Pierron, Sander, 1932: La sculpture en Belgique, 1830–1930, pp. 63, 64 and 69. Paris-Brussels
 Gauchez, M., 1922: Les vivants et les morts, p. 249-252. Brussels
 Pierron, Sander, 1913: Guillaume Charlier. Brussels
 Verdainne, G., 1897: Guillaume Charlier. Bergen

1854 births
1925 deaths
People from Ixelles
Belgian sculptors